Dunboy may refer to:
 Dunboy Castle, County Cork, Ireland
 Siege of Dunboy, in 1602